Rhinestone Cowboy Live, on the Air & in the Studio is made up of songs performed on the TV show Melody Ranch around 1967, tracks from My Hits and Love Songs (1999) plus some previously unreleased tracks (that have however been released on quite a few compilation albums since 1995) on the first disc, a selection of songs from Glen Campbell Live (1981) on the second, and a complete reissue of Glen Campbell Live! His Greatest Hits (1994) on the third disc.

Track listing
Disc 1:  Broadcast Recordings

 "By The Time I Get To Phoenix" (Jimmy Webb)
 "Gentle On My Mind" (John Hartford)
 "Cripple Creek" (Traditional)
 "A Satisfied Mind" (J. Hayes, J. Rhodes)
 "Burning Bridges" (Walter Scott)
 "White Lightning" (J. P. Richardson)
 "Good Old Mountain Dew" (with The Melody Ranch Gang) (Traditional)
 "Only The Lonely" (Roy Orbison, Joe Melson)

 Studio Recordings

 "Rhinestone Cowboy" (Larry Weiss)
 "Blue Sky Shining" (Mickey Newberry)
 "Bridge Over Troubled Water" (Paul Simon)
 "Without You" (Pete Ham, Tom Evans)
 "Colleen" (Copyright Control)
 "Feelings" (M. Albert, L. Gaste)
 "The Impossible Dream" (Mitch Leigh, Joe Darion)
 "You'll Never Walk Alone" (Richard Rodgers, Oscar Hammerstein)

Disc 2:  Live 1994

 "Gentle On my Mind" (John Hartford)
 "By The Time I Get To Phoenix" (Jimmy Webb)
 "Galveston" (Jimmy Webb)
 "Kentucky Means Paradise" (Merle Travis)
 "Wichita Lineman" (Jimmy Webb)
 "Mansion In Branson" (Braddock, Overstreet)
 "Here In The Real World" (Jackson, Irwin)
 "Classical Gas" (instrumental) (Mason Williams)
 "Rhinestone Cowboy" (Larry Weiss)
 "Hits Medley"
 "It's Only Make Believe" (Conway Twitty, Jack Nance)
 "Turn Around, Look At Me" (Jerry Capehart)
 "Where's The Playground Susie" (Jimmy Webb)
 "Hey Little One" (Dorsey Burnette, Barry De Vorzon)
 "Country Boy (You Got Your Feet In LA)" (Dennis Lambert, Brian Potter)
 "Mary In The Morning" (Cymbal, Lendell)
 "Dreams of the Everyday Housewife" (Chris Gantry)
 "Sunflower" (Neil Diamond)
 "Let It Be Me" (with Debby Campbell) (Mann Curtis, Gilbert Bécaud, Pierre Delanoë)
 "No More Night" (Harris)
 "Southern Nights" (Allen Toussaint)

Disc 3:  Live 1981

 "Rhinestone Cowboy" (Larry Weiss) - 3:15
 "Medley" - 4:29
 "Wichita Lineman" (Jimmy Webb)
 "Galveston" (Jimmy Webb)
 "Country Boy (You Got Your Feet In LA)" (Dennis Lambert, Brian Potter)
 "Dreams of the Everyday Housewife" (Chris Gantry) - 2:12
 "Heartache Number Three" (Steve Hardin) - 2:56
 "Please Come To Boston" (Dave Loggins) - 3:42
 "It's Only Make Believe" (Conway Twitty, Jack Nance) - 2:39
 "Crying" (Roy Orbison, Joe Melson) - 3:35
 "Bluegrass Medley" - 5:15
 "Foggy Mountain Breakdown " (Earl Scruggs)
 "Orange Blossom Special" (E. Rouse)
 "Milk Cow Blues" (Arnold) - 5:18
 "Rollin' (In My Sweet Baby's Arms)" (J. Clement) - 3:35
 "I'm So Lonesome I Could Cry" (Hank Williams) - 3:27
 "Southern Nights" (Allen Toussaint) - 3:59
 "Amazing Grace" (John Newton) - 4:31
 "Try A Little Kindness" (Sapaugh, Austin) - 2:36
 "Loving Arms" (Tom Jans)" - 3:31
 "Mull of Kintyre" (Paul McCartney, Denny Laine) - 6:12

2005 compilation albums
2005 live albums
Glen Campbell compilation albums